Neofytos Sakellaridis-Mangouras (born January 31, 1989) is a Greek cyclist.

Personal life
Outside of cycling, Sakellaridis-Mangouras is a graduate teaching assistant at the University of Glasgow School of Law.

Major results
Source: 

2008
 1st  Time trial, National Under-23 Road Championships
2009
 1st  Time trial, National Under-23 Road Championships
2010
 National Road Championships
3rd Under-23 time trial
3rd Road race
2011
 National Road Championships
2nd Under-23 time trial
2nd Road race
2012
 3rd Time trial, National Road Championships
2013
 2nd Time trial, National Road Championships
2014
 3rd Time trial, National Road Championships
2015
 2nd Time trial, National Road Championships

References

External links

1989 births
Living people
Greek male cyclists
Sportspeople from Denver
21st-century Greek people